John Alexander (Bill, Jack) "Winny" Winchester (May 21, 1881 – May 7, 1911) was a professional ice hockey player who played 93 games in various professional and amateur leagues, including the National Hockey Association and International Professional Hockey League.  Amongst the teams he played with were the Montreal Shamrocks, Winnipeg Maple Leafs and the Pittsburgh Professionals. A goaltender with Pittsburgh from 1904–1907, he posted a record of 34-29 with the team.

He died of acute diabetes in Edmonton in 1911.

References

External links
"Jack Winchester is a crack goal tender" The Pittsburgh Press, March 5, 1907.
Is Pittsburgh the Birthplace of Professional Hockey? at Pittsburgh Hockey

1881 births
1911 deaths
Canadian ice hockey goaltenders
Ice hockey people from Ontario
Montreal Shamrocks players
Pittsburgh Professionals players
Sportspeople from Belleville, Ontario
Winnipeg Maple Leafs players